The Viola Concerto, Sz. 120, BB 128 (also known as Concerto for Viola and Orchestra) was one of the last pieces Béla Bartók wrote. He began composing it while living in Saranac Lake, New York, in July 1945. It was commissioned by William Primrose, a respected violist who knew that Bartók could provide a challenging piece for him to perform. He said that Bartók should not "feel in any way proscribed by the apparent technical limitations of the instrument". Bartók was suffering the terminal stages of leukemia when he began writing the piece and left only sketches at the time of his death.

History
Primrose asked Bartók to write the concerto in the winter of 1944. They exchanged several letters about the piece. In one, from September 8, 1945, Bartók claims that he is nearly done with it and only has the orchestration to complete. The sketches show that this was not truly the case. After Bartók died, his close friend Tibor Serly completed the piece in 1949. A first revision was made by Bartók's son Peter and Paul Neubauer in 1995, and it was revised once more by Csaba Erdélyi. The concerto was premiered on December 2, 1949, by Primrose and the Minneapolis Symphony Orchestra, with Antal Doráti conducting. Another revision has been prepared by the violist Tabea Zimmermann.

Form
The concerto has three movements, and Bartók wrote in a letter dated August 5, 1945 that the general concept is "a serious Allegro, a Scherzo, a (rather short) slow movement, and a finale beginning Allegretto and developing the tempo to an Allegro molto. Each movement, or at least 3 of them will, [be] preceded by a (short) recurring introduction (mostly solo for the viola), a kind of ritornello." (The aforementioned idea of a thematic introduction to each movement was also used in Bartók's String Quartet No. 6.) The first movement is in a loose sonata form. The second movement is significantly shorter, and closes with a very short scherzo movement with an attacca into the third movement. Bartók's manuscript gives the first movement's duration as 10’20", the second as 5’10" and the third as 4’45".

The first and third movements are said to loosely contain a phrase reminiscent of the Scottish tune "Gin a Body Meet a Body, Colmin' Thro' the Rye." This is probably in honor of Primrose's heritage.

Instrumentation
Bartók's manuscript only specifies flute, oboe, 2 clarinets, bassoon, horns, 2 trumpets, timpani, strings.

Serly's edition is orchestrated for piccolo, 2 flutes, 2 oboes, 2 clarinets in B, 2 bassoons, 3 horns in F, 3 trumpets in B, 2 trombones, tuba, timpani, percussion and strings.

Peter Bartók and Paul Neubauer's edition is orchestrated for piccolo, 2 flutes, 2 oboes (2nd doubling cor anglais), 2 clarinets in B, 2 bassoons (2nd doubling contrabassoon), 4 horns in F, 3 trumpets in B, tenor trombone, bass trombone, tuba, timpani, percussion (2), strings.

Editions
There are some large discrepancies between the different editions. Some are as simple as the metronome markings. Each editor also had very different interpretations of fingerings for the concerto. One edition suggests beginning the first movement on the open A string, while others suggest beginning on the D string. The Peter Bartók edition, especially, has interesting fingerings because Neubauer edited most of the viola part.

Many bowings also differ between different editions, some of them inserted specifically to accent certain rhythms and high notes, such as in mm. 8-10 in Serly's edition, where Primrose included some bowing suggestions to emphasize the syncopation.

Overall, there are significant surface-level discrepancies such as bowings, fingerings and dynamics. Some editions contain more changes than editor markings; in Peter Bartók's revision, measures are added, completely missing, or with note changes.

Omissions and amendments between editions
Peter Bartók said, "It became clear that we could not merely compare the printed score with the final manuscript prepared from my father’s sketches by Tibor Serly, and discover engraving errors, but we would have to start with the sketch itself."

The first of the note changes begins in measure 44 on beat two, where there is an added D as a double stop against a D. In the next measure, the first beat is transposed down an octave, probably to facilitate performance. Everything remains consistent until measure 54, where Serly has the viola resting but Peter Bartók has included two measures of melody in the soloist's part. Serly's edition makes measure 67 a  bar, but Peter Bartók splits it into a  bar plus a  bar and adds a group of triplets. This trend of alterations continues as Peter Bartók adds octave displacements, and omits what is measure 74 in Serly's version.

Arrangement as a cello concerto

Serly also arranged the work as a cello concerto. After the completion, a gathering of friends of Bartók expressed an eight-to-six preference for the cello adaption over the original. Cellist János Starker was the first to play and record the adaptation.

Recordings
 Béla Bartók, Concerto for Viola and Orchestra. Compact disc. Hong-Mei Xiao, HNH International Ltd, 1998. Conductor János Kovács and soloist Hong-Mei Xiao playing both the Peter Bartók and the original Tibor Serly. This CD will be useful for comparing the two versions.

Other recordings:
Béla Bartók, Concerto for Viola and Orchestra; William Primrose; Otto Klemperer conducting the Concertgebouw Orchestra; Live recording, Amsterdam, 10 January 1951; Archiphon, 1992.
Béla Bartók, Concerto for Viola and Orchestra. Yuri Bashmet, soloist and Pierre Boulez conducting. Compact disc. Hong-Mei Xiao: HNH International Ltd, 1998.
Béla Bartók, Concerto for Viola and Orchestra. Rivka Golani, soloist and Andras Ligeti conducting the Budapest Symphony Orchestra. Compact disc. Conifer CDCF-189, 1990.
Béla Bartók, Concerto for Viola and Orchestra; Yehudi Menuhin; Antal Dorati conducting the New Philharmonia Orchestra; EMI, 1991.
Bartók, Béla. Concerto for Viola and Orchestra. Hong-Mei Xiao. János Kovács. HNH International Ltd. 1998. Compact disc.
Bartók, Béla. Concerto for Viola and Orchestra. Yuri Bashmet. Pierre Boulez. Deutsche Grammophon GmbH. 2008. Compact disc.
Bartók, Béla. Viola Concerto. Pinchas Zukerman. Leonard Slatkin. BMG Music. 1991. Compact disc.
Bartók, Béla. Viola Concerto. (The Erdélyi restoration and orchestration - world premiere recording) Csaba Erdélyi. New Zealand Symphony Orchestra conducted by Marc Taddei. Concordance. 2002. Compact disc.
Béla Bartók, Viola Concerto. Yo-Yo Ma (on a vertical viola), tracks 5-6-7 on The New York Album, Baltimore Symphony Orchestra, conducted by David Zinman, Sony Classical, 1993. Compact disc.
Béla Bartók, Concerto for Viola and Orchestra; Kim Kashkashian; Peter Eötvös conducting the Netherlands Radio Chamber Orchestra; ECM-Records, 2000.

As a cello concerto:
Bartók, Béla. Cello Concerto. János Starker; Leonard Slatkin conducting the St. Louis Symphony Orchestra; Rca Victor Red Seal, 1992.
Bartók, Béla. Cello Concerto. Raphael Wallfisch; Gábor Takács-Nagy conducting the BBC National Orchestra of Wales; Nimbus, 2015.

Notes

References
 Adams, Bryon. "Walton, William." Grove Music Online. Oxford Music Online, S.v. (accessed October 7, 2012).
 Bartók, Béla. Viola Concerto, with a commentary by László Somfai and a fair transcription of the draft with notes by Nelson Dellamaggiore. Homosassa, FL: Bartok Records, 1995. 
 Bartók, Béla. Viola Concerto: Facsimile Edition of the Autograph Draft., edited by Nelson Dellamaggiore. Tampa: Rinaldi Printing, 1995.
 Bartók, Béla. Viola Concerto (Op. posth.), revised version by Nelson Dellamaggiore and Peter Bartók. Reduction for viola and piano, viola part edited by Paul Neubauer. Boosey & Hawkes 9854. London and New York: Boosey & Hawkes, 1995.
 Bartók, Béla. Viola Concerto (restoration and orchestration by Csaba Erdélyi) Promethean Editions New Zealand 2004  
 Bartók, Peter. "The Principal Theme of Béla Bartók's Viola Concerto". Studia Musicologica Academiae Scientiarum Hungaricae 35, nos. 1–3 (1993): 45–50.
 Bartók, Peter. "Commentary on the Revision of Béla Bartók's Viola Concerto". Journal of The American Viola Society 12, no. 1 (1996): 11–33.
 Bartók, Peter. "Correcting Printed Editions of Béla Bartók's Viola Concerto and Other Compositions". In Bartók Perspectives: Man, Composer, and Ethnomusicologist, edited by Elliott Antokoletz, Victoria Fischer, and  Benjamin Suchoff, 245–59. Oxford and New York: Oxford University Press, 2000. .
 Dalton, David. "The Genesis of Bartók's Viola Concerto". Music & Letters 57, no. 2 (April 1976): 117–29.
 Dellamaggiore, Nelson. "Deciphering Béla Bartók's Viola Concerto Sketch". In  Bartók Perspectives: Man, Composer, and Ethnomusicologist, edited by Elliott Antokoletz, Victoria Fischer, and  Benjamin Suchoff, 260–70. Oxford ; New York: Oxford University Press, 2000. 
 Foldes, Andor. "Béla Bartók." Tempo no. 43 (1957): 20+22-26.
 Gillies, Malcolm: "Béla Bartók", Grove Music Online ed. L. Macy (Accessed June 25, 2005), (subscription access) 
 Kovács, Sándor. "Reexamining the Bartók, Serly Viola Concerto". Studia Musicologica Academiae Scientiarum Hungaricae 23 (1981): 295–322.
 Kovács, Sándor. "Formprobleme beim Violakonzert von Bartók/Serly". Studia Musicologica Academiae Scientiarum Hungaricae 24 (1983): 381–91.
 Laki, Peter. "Works for Solo Violin and the Viola Concerto". In The Cambridge Companion to Bartók, edited by Amanda Bayley, 133–50. Cambridge Companions to Music. Cambridge and New York: Cambridge University Press, 2001.  (cloth);  (pbk.).
 Maurice, Donald. "Bartók's Viola Concerto: New Light from New Zealand". Music in New Zealand, no. 21 (Winter 1993): 26–27.
 Maurice, Donald. Bartók's Viola Concerto: The Remarkable Story of His Swansong. New York: Oxford University Press, 2004. 
 Serly, Tibor. "A Belated Account of the Reconstruction of a 20th-Century Masterpiece". College Music Symposium 15 (Spring 1975): 7–25.
 Smith, Howard, and Elisa M. Welch." Unfinished Business: The Tangled History of Béla Bartók's Final Work". Strings 16, no. 8 (102, May–June 2002): 59–61.
 Somfai, László. Bartók's Workshop: Documents of the Compositional Process: Exhibition of the Budapest Bartók Archives in the Museum of Music History of the Institute of Musicology of the Hungarian Academy of Sciences. Budapest: Magyar Tudományos Akadémia (MTA) (Zenetudományi Intézet), 1995. .
 Somfai, László. "Invention, Form, Narrative in Béla Bartók’s Music." Studia Musicologica Academiae Scientiarum Hungaricae T. 44, fasc. 3/4 (2003): 291-303.
 Straus, Joseph. "Disability and ‘Late Style’ in Music." Journal of Musicology 25, no. 1 (2008): 3-45.
 Szigeti, Joseph. "A Tribute to Bartók." Tempo, no. 10 (1948-1949): 16+19-21.
 Whittall, Arnold. "At Source". The Musical Times 137, no. 1836 (February 1996): 10–12.

Concertos by Béla Bartók
Bartok
1945 compositions
Musical compositions completed by others
Bartok